Dave Arnold (born September 17, 1944) is a former American football coach.  He served as the head football coach at Montana State University team from 1983 to 1986, compiling a record of 18–29.  Arnold led his 1984 Montana State Bobcats team to a 12–2 record, a Big Sky Conference title, and the NCAA Division I-AA Football Championship.  For his effort, he was named the AFCA Division I-AA Coach of the Year that season.  The 1984 championship run followed a season in 1983 in which the Bobcats finished 1–10 and last in the conference, but defeated their in-state rival, the University of Montana Grizzlies in their sole win. The 11-game turnaround is one of the largest in college football history.

Arnold worked as an assistant coach under Dennis Erickson at Washington State University and Miami University and then in the National Football League (NFL), coordinating the special teams for the Seattle Seahawks from 1995 through 1997.  With the Seahawks, he coached with Rick Tuten when he led the NFL in yards per punt in 1995.  Kicker Todd Peterson made over 82 percent of his field goals in 1995 and 1996.

Head coaching record

College

References

1944 births
Living people
Albion Britons football coaches
Colorado State Rams football coaches
Miami Hurricanes football coaches
Michigan State Spartans football coaches
Montana State Bobcats football coaches
Seattle Seahawks coaches
Washington State Cougars football coaches
High school football coaches in Michigan